Kollur mandal is one of the 25 mandals in Bapatla district of the Indian state of Andhra Pradesh. It is under the administration of Tenali revenue division and the headquarters are located at Kollur.

Geography 
The mandal is situated on the banks of Krishna River, bounded by Vemuru, Bhattiprolu and Kollipara mandals.

Demographics 

 census, the mandal had a population of 55,323. The total population constitute, 27,709 males and 27,614 females —a sex ratio of 997 females per 1000 males. 4,876 children are in the age group of 0–6 years, of which 2,509 are boys and 2,367 are girls. The average literacy rate stands at 69.31% with 34,967 literates. Kollur is the most populated and Boddulurupadu is the least populated villages in the mandal.

Administration 

The present tahsildar is A.Seshagiri Rao. The mandal also forms a part of the Andhra Pradesh Capital Region, under the jurisdiction of APCRDA.

Politics 
Kollur mandal is one of the 5 mandals under  Vemuru (SC) (Assembly constituency), which in turn represents Bapatla (SC) (Lok Sabha constituency) of Andhra Pradesh.

Settlements 
 census, the mandal has 12 revenue villages, 24 gram panchayats and no towns.

The settlements in the mandal are listed below:

See also 
 List of mandals in Andhra Pradesh
 List of villages in Guntur district

References 

Mandals in Guntur district